Batrachorhina griseotincta is a species of beetle in the family Cerambycidae. It was described by Léon Fairmaire in 1904.

Subspecies
 B. g. fuscosignata Breuning,
 B. g. griseotincta (Fairmaire, 1904)

References

Batrachorhina
Beetles described in 1904
Taxa named by Léon Fairmaire